Mathematical programming with equilibrium constraints (MPEC) is the study of 
constrained optimization problems  where the constraints include variational inequalities or  complementarities. MPEC is related to the Stackelberg game. 

MPEC is used in the study of engineering design, economic equilibrium, and multilevel games.

MPEC is difficult to deal with because its feasible region is not necessarily convex or even connected.

References

 Z.-Q. Luo, J.-S. Pang and D. Ralph: Mathematical Programs with Equilibrium Constraints. Cambridge University Press, 1996, .
 B. Baumrucker, J. Renfro, L. T. Biegler, MPEC problem formulations and solution strategies with chemical engineering applications, Computers & Chemical Engineering, 32 (12) (2008) 2903-2913.
 A. U. Raghunathan, M. S. Diaz, L. T. Biegler, An MPEC formulation for dynamic optimization of distillation operations, Computers & Chemical Engineering, 28 (10) (2004) 2037-2052.

External links
 MPEC examples such as SIGN, ABS, MIN, and MAX
 Formulating logical statements as continuously differentiable nonlinear programming problems

Mathematical optimization